Jean Heeremans (31 January 1914 – 2 August 1970) was a Belgian fencer. He competed in the team foil event at the 1936 Summer Olympics.

References

1914 births
1970 deaths
Sportspeople from Hainaut (province)
Belgian male fencers
Olympic fencers of Belgium
Fencers at the 1936 Summer Olympics